Edward E. Van Gerpen (born March 23, 1938) is an American former politician. He has served as a Republican member in the South Dakota House of Representatives from 1985 to 1988, 1993 to 1996, and 2011 to 2012.

References

1948 births
Living people
People from Bon Homme County, South Dakota
Farmers from South Dakota
Republican Party members of the South Dakota House of Representatives